Ramform Titan is a marine seismic acquisition vessel built by the MHI shipyard in Nagasaki in 2013. It is operated by Norwegian company Petroleum Geo-Services (PGS) and is used for 3D seismic data acquisition. It was called "the world's ugliest ship". PGS built four such Titan-class vessels: the second ship was called Ramform Atlas, the third called Ramform Hyperion, and the fourth Ramform Tethys.

References

External links 
 

Research_vessels